Charlie Ashcroft (3 July 1926 – 13 March 2010) was an English footballer.

His first club was Eccleston Juniors, whom he left in May 1946 for Liverpool. He stayed with them for nine years, appearing 87 times.

In June 1955 he signed for Ipswich Town, staying for only a season before leaving for Coventry City, his last club.

He died at the age of 83 in March 2010.

Notes

External links 

Profile on Pride of Anglia website
Profile at LFCHistory.net

1926 births
2010 deaths
Association football goalkeepers
English footballers
England B international footballers
Liverpool F.C. players
Ipswich Town F.C. players
Coventry City F.C. players
Sportspeople from Chorley
English Football League players
Chorley F.C. players